The rivière à la Pêche is a tributary of Chigoubiche River, flowing in the unorganized territory of Lac-Ashuapmushuan in the Le Domaine-du-Roy Regional County Municipality, in the administrative region of Saguenay–Lac-Saint-Jean, in province of Quebec, in Canada.

The valley of the Rivière à la Pêche is mainly served by forest roads which connect northwards to route 167.

Forestry (mainly forestry) is the main economic activity in this valley; secondly, recreational tourism activities, mainly because of the Ashuapmushuan Wildlife Reserve.

Geography 
The Rivière à la Pêche has its source at the confluence of two mountain streams.

This is located in a mountainous area in the unorganized territory of Lac-Ashuapmushuan, at:
  north-east of the course of the rivière du Pilet;
  south of the mouth of Rivière à la Pêche;
  south of the railway;
  southwest of the course of the Ashuapmushuan River.

  towards the east in a valley more and more deep, until a bend of the river, corresponding to the discharge (coming from the south-east of a set of lakes including Régis, Hélène and Lamarque);
  north, first in a deep valley, forming a hook east, then north occasionally forming small coils at the end of the segment, up to the discharge ( coming from the west) from lakes Congénères, de l'Essaie and Miserable;
 , winding through a forest plain, to the Canadian National railway;
  towards the northwest by forming small coils, collecting the discharge (coming from the west) of Lac Gagnon and the discharge (coming from the north) of Lac Manerbe, crossing the lac Dalpé, by cutting route 167, collecting the discharge (coming from the west) of Lac Ermont, and bypassing an island at the end of the segment, up to its mouth.

The Rivière à la Pêche flows on the south bank of the Chigoubiche River. This confluence is located upstream of a series of rapids, and at:
  south-west of the mouth of the Chigoubiche River;
  northwest of downtown Saint-Félicien.

Toponymy 
The toponym "rivière à la Pêche" was made official on December 5, 1968, at the Place Names Bank of the Commission de toponymie du Québec.

See also 

 List of rivers of Quebec

References 

Rivers of Saguenay–Lac-Saint-Jean
Le Domaine-du-Roy Regional County Municipality